Avalon Boulevard is a north-south street in Los Angeles County.

Geography
Avalon Boulevard is formed after San Pedro Street intersects with Jefferson Boulevard east of Exposition Park. It ends at Water Street in Wilmington. In Wilmington, Avalon Boulevard is the west-east postal divider for that district.

Transportation
Avalon Boulevard carries Metro Local lines 51 and 246; Line 51 serves Avalon Boulevard between Jefferson Boulevard and Victoria Street, and Line 246 south of Victoria Street.

Metro C Line
The Metro C Line operates a freeway median rail station in the center median of the Century Freeway(Interstate 105) above Avalon Boulevard.

References

Streets in Los Angeles County, California
Streets in Los Angeles
Boulevards in the United States
Carson, California
Compton, California
Willowbrook, California
Wilmington, Los Angeles